The Iberian Peninsula, also known as Iberia, is a peninsula in south-western Europe, defining the westernmost edge of Eurasia. It is divided between Peninsular Spain and Continental Portugal, comprising most of the region, as well as Andorra, Gibraltar, and a small part of Southern France.

Name

Greek name
The word Iberia is a noun adapted from the Latin word "Hiberia" originating in the Ancient Greek word Ἰβηρία, used by Greek geographers under the rule of the Roman Empire to refer to what is known today in English as the Iberian Peninsula. At that time, the name did not describe a single geographical entity or a distinct population; the same name was used for the Kingdom of Iberia, natively known as Kartli in the Caucasus, the core region of what would later become the Kingdom of Georgia. It was Strabo who first reported the delineation of "Iberia" from Gaul (Keltikē) by the Pyrenees and included the entire land mass southwest (he says "west") from there. With the fall of the Western Roman Empire and the consolidation of romanic languages, the word "Iberia" continued the Roman word "Hiberia" and the Greek word "Ἰβηρία".

The ancient Greeks reached the Iberian Peninsula, of which they had heard from the Phoenicians, by voyaging westward on the Mediterranean. Hecataeus of Miletus was the first known to use the term Iberia, which he wrote about circa 500 BCE. Herodotus of Halicarnassus says of the Phocaeans that "it was they who made the Greeks acquainted with […] Iberia." According to Strabo, prior historians used Iberia to mean the country "this side of the Ἶβηρος" (the Ebro) as far north as the Rhône, but in his day they set the Pyrenees as the limit. Polybius respects that limit, but identifies Iberia as the Mediterranean side as far south as Gibraltar, with the Atlantic side having no name. Elsewhere he says that Saguntum is "on the seaward foot of the range of hills connecting Iberia and Celtiberia."

Roman names

According to Charles Ebel, the ancient sources in both Latin and Greek use Hispania and Hiberia (Greek: Iberia) as synonyms. The confusion of the words was because of an overlapping in political and geographic perspectives. The Latin word Hiberia, similar to the Greek Iberia, literally translates to "land of the Hiberians". This word was derived from the river Hiberus (now called Ebro or Ebre). Hiber (Iberian) was thus used as a term for peoples living near the river Ebro. The first mention in Roman literature was by the annalist poet Ennius in 200 BCE. Virgil wrote impacatos (H)iberos ("restless Iberi") in his Georgics. The Roman geographers and other prose writers from the time of the late Roman Republic called the entire peninsula Hispania.

In Greek and Roman antiquity, the name Hesperia was used for both the Italian and Iberian Peninsula; in the latter case Hesperia Ultima (referring to its position in the far west) appears as form of disambiguation from the former among Roman writers.
Also since Roman antiquity, Jews gave the name Sepharad to the peninsula.

As they became politically interested in the former Carthaginian territories, the Romans began to use the names Hispania Citerior and Hispania Ulterior for 'near' and 'far' Hispania. At the time Hispania was made up of three Roman provinces: Hispania Baetica, Hispania Tarraconensis, and Hispania Lusitania. Strabo says that the Romans use Hispania and Iberia synonymously, distinguishing between the near northern and the far southern provinces. (The name Iberia was ambiguous, being also the name of the Kingdom of Iberia in the Caucasus.)

Whatever languages may generally have been spoken on the peninsula soon gave way to Latin, except for that of the Vascones, which was preserved as a language isolate by the barrier of the Pyrenees.

Modern name 
The modern phrase "Iberian Peninsula" was coined by the French geographer Jean-Baptiste Bory de Saint-Vincent on his 1823 work "Guide du Voyageur en Espagne". Prior to that date, geographers had used the terms 'Spanish Peninsula' or 'Pyrenaean Peninsula'.

Etymology

The Iberian Peninsula has always been associated with the River Ebro (Ibēros in ancient Greek and Ibērus or Hibērus in Latin). The association was so well known it was hardly necessary to state; for example, Ibēria was the country "this side of the Ibērus" in Strabo. Pliny goes so far as to assert that the Greeks had called "the whole of Spain" Hiberia because of the Hiberus River. The river appears in the Ebro Treaty of 226 BCE between Rome and Carthage, setting the limit of Carthaginian interest at the Ebro. The fullest description of the treaty, stated in Appian, uses Ibērus. With reference to this border, Polybius states that the "native name" is Ibēr, apparently the original word, stripped of its Greek or Latin -os or -us termination.

The early range of these natives, which geographers and historians place from the present southern Spain to the present southern France along the Mediterranean coast, is marked by instances of a readable script expressing a yet unknown language, dubbed "Iberian". Whether this was the native name or was given to them by the Greeks for their residence near the Ebro remains unknown. Credence in Polybius imposes certain limitations on etymologizing: if the language remains unknown, the meanings of the words, including Iber, must also remain unknown. In modern Basque, the word ibar means "valley" or "watered meadow", while ibai means "river", but there is no proof relating the etymology of the Ebro River with these Basque names.

Prehistory

Palaeolithic
The Iberian Peninsula has been inhabited by members of the Homo genus for at least 1.2 million years as remains found in the sites in the Atapuerca Mountains demonstrate. Among these sites is the cave of Gran Dolina, where six hominin skeletons, dated between 780,000 and one million years ago, were found in 1994. Experts have debated whether these skeletons belong to the species Homo erectus, Homo heidelbergensis, or a new species called Homo antecessor.

Around 200,000 BP, during the Lower Paleolithic period, Neanderthals first entered the Iberian Peninsula. Around 70,000 BP, during the Middle Paleolithic period, the last glacial event began and the Neanderthal Mousterian culture was established. Around 37,000 BP, during the Upper Paleolithic, the Neanderthal Châtelperronian cultural period began. Emanating from Southern France, this culture extended into the north of the peninsula. It continued to exist until around 30,000 BP, when Neanderthal man faced extinction.

About 40,000 years ago, anatomically modern humans entered the Iberian Peninsula from Southern France. Haplogroup R1b is common in modern Portuguese and Spanish males.  On the Iberian Peninsula, modern humans developed a series of different cultures, such as the Aurignacian, Gravettian, Solutrean and Magdalenian cultures, some of them characterized by the complex forms of the art of the Upper Paleolithic.

Neolithic
During the Neolithic expansion, various megalithic cultures developed in the Iberian Peninsula. An open seas navigation culture from the east Mediterranean, called the Cardium culture, also extended its influence to the eastern coasts of the peninsula, possibly as early as the 5th millennium BCE. These people may have had some relation to the subsequent development of the Iberian civilization.

As is the case for most of the rest of Southern Europe, the principal ancestral origin of modern Iberians are Early European Farmers who arrived during the Neolithic. The large predominance of Y-Chromosome Haplogroup R1b, common throughout Western Europe, is testimony to a considerable input from various waves of (predominantly male) Western Steppe Herders from the Pontic–Caspian steppe during the Bronze Age. Iberia experienced a significant genetic turnover, with 100% of the paternal ancestry and 40% of the overall ancestry being replaced by peoples with steppe-related ancestry.

Chalcolithic

In the Chalcolithic ( 3000 BCE), a series of complex cultures developed that would give rise to the peninsula's first civilizations and to extensive exchange networks reaching to the Baltic, Middle East and North Africa. Around 2800 – 2700 BCE, the Beaker culture, which produced the Maritime Bell Beaker, probably originated in the vibrant copper-using communities of the Tagus estuary in Portugal and spread from there to many parts of western Europe.

Bronze Age
Bronze Age cultures developed beginning  1800 BCE, when the culture of Los Millares was followed by that of El Argar. During the Early Bronze Age, southeastern Iberia saw the emergence of important settlements, a development that has compelled some archeologists to propose that these settlements indicate the advent of state-level social structures. From this centre, bronze metalworking technology spread to other cultures like the Bronze of Levante, South-Western Iberian Bronze and Las Cogotas.

In the Late Bronze Age, the urban civilisation of Tartessos developed in Southwestern Iberia, characterized by Phoenician influence and using the Southwest Paleohispanic script for its Tartessian language, not related to the Iberian language.

Early in the first millennium BCE, several waves of Pre-Celts and Celts migrated from Central Europe, thus partially changing the peninsula's ethnic landscape to Indo-European-speaking in its northern and western regions.  In Northwestern Iberia (modern Northern Portugal, Asturias and Galicia), a Celtic culture developed, the Castro culture, with a large number of hill forts and some fortified cities.

Proto-history

By the Iron Age, starting in the 7th century BCE, the Iberian Peninsula consisted of complex agrarian and urban civilizations, either Pre-Celtic or Celtic (such as the Celtiberians, Gallaeci, Astures, Celtici, Lusitanians and others), the cultures of the Iberians in the eastern and southern zones and the cultures of the Aquitanian in the western portion of the Pyrenees.

As early as the 12th century BCE, the Phoenicians, a thalassocratic civilization originally from the Eastern Mediterranean, began to explore the coastline of the peninsula, interacting with the metal-rich communities in the southwest of the peninsula (contemporarily known as the semi-mythical Tartessos). Around 1100 BCE, Phoenician merchants founded the trading colony of Gadir or Gades (modern day Cádiz). Phoenicians established a permanent trading port in the Gadir colony circa 800 BCE in response to the increasing demand of silver from the Assyrian Empire.

The seafaring Phoenicians, Greeks and Carthaginians successively settled along the Mediterranean coast and founded trading colonies there over a period of several centuries. In the 8th century BCE, the first Greek colonies, such as Emporion (modern Empúries), were founded along the Mediterranean coast on the east, leaving the south coast to the Phoenicians.

Together with the presence of Phoenician and Greek epigraphy, a number of paleohispanic scripts developed in the Iberian Peninsula along the 1st millennium BCE. The development of a primordial paleohispanic script antecessor to the rest of paleohispanic scripts (originally supposed to be a non-redundant semi-syllabary) derived from the Phoenician alphabet and originated in Southwestern Iberia by the 7th century BCE has been tentatively proposed.

In the sixth century BCE, the Carthaginians arrived in the peninsula while struggling with the Greeks for control of the Western Mediterranean. Their most important colony was Carthago Nova (modern-day Cartagena, Spain).

History

Roman rule

In 218 BCE, during the Second Punic War against the Carthaginians, the first Roman troops occupied the Iberian Peninsula, known to them as Hispania. After 197, the territories of the peninsula most accustomed to external contact and with the most urban tradition (the Mediterranean Coast and the Guadalquivir Valley) were divided by Romans into Hispania Ulterior and Hispania Citerior. Local rebellions were quelled, with a 195 Roman campaign under Cato the Elder ravaging hospots of resistance in the northeastern Ebro Valley and beyond. The threat to Roman interests posed by Celtiberians and Lusitanians in uncontrolled territories lingered in. Further wars of indigenous resistance, such as the Celtiberian Wars and the Lusitanian War, were fought in the 2nd century. Urban growth took place, and population progressively moved from hillforts to the plains.

An example of the interaction of slaving and ecocide, the aftermath of the conquest increased mining extractive processes in the southwest of the peninsula (which required a massive number of forced laborers, initially from Hispania and latter also from the Gallic borderlands and other locations of the Mediterranean), bringing in a far-reaching environmental outcome vis-à-vis long-term global pollution records, with levels of atmospheric pollution from mining across the Mediterranean during Classical Antiquity having no match until the Industrial Revolution.

In addition to mineral extraction (of which the region was the leading supplier in the early Roman world, with production of the likes of gold, silver,  copper, lead, and cinnabar), Hispania also produced manufactured goods (sigillata pottery, colourless glass, linen garments) fish and fish sauce (garum), dry crops (such as wheat and, more importantly, esparto), olive oil, and wine.

The process of Romanization spurred on throughout the first century BC. The peninsula was also the battleground of civil wars between rulers of the Roman republic, such as the Sertorian War or the conflict between Caesar and Pompey later in the century.

During their 600-year occupation of the Iberian Peninsula, the Romans introduced the Latin language that influenced many of the languages that exist today in the Iberian peninsula.

Pre-modern Iberia 

In the early fifth century, Germanic peoples occupied the peninsula, namely the Suebi, the Vandals (Silingi and Hasdingi) and their allies, the Alans. Only the kingdom of the Suebi (Quadi and Marcomanni) would endure after the arrival of another wave of Germanic invaders, the Visigoths, who occupied all of the Iberian Peninsula and expelled or partially integrated the Vandals and the Alans. The Visigoths eventually occupied the Suebi kingdom and its capital city, Bracara (modern day Braga), in 584–585. They would also occupy the province of the Byzantine Empire (552–624) of Spania in the south of the peninsula. However, Balearic Islands remained in Byzantine hands until Umayyad conquest in 707.

In 711, a Muslim army conquered the Visigothic Kingdom in Hispania. Under Tariq ibn Ziyad, the Islamic army landed at Gibraltar and, in an eight-year campaign, occupied all except the northern kingdoms of the Iberian Peninsula in the Umayyad conquest of Hispania. Al-Andalus (tr. al-ʾAndalūs, possibly "Land of the Vandals"), is the Arabic name given to Muslim Iberia. The Muslim conquerors were Arabs and Berbers; following the conquest, conversion and arabization of the Hispano-Roman population took place,  (muwalladum or Muladí). After a long process, spurred on in the 9th and 10th centuries, the majority of the population in Al-Andalus eventually converted to Islam. The Muslims were referred to by the generic name Moors. The Muslim population was divided per ethnicity (Arabs, Berbers, Muladí), and the supremacy of Arabs over the rest of group was a recurrent causal for strife, rivalry and hatred, particularly between Arabs and Berbers. Arab elites could be further divided in the Yemenites (first wave) and the Syrians (second wave). Christians and Jews were allowed to live as part of a stratified society under the dhimmah system, although Jews became very important in certain fields. Some Christians migrated to the Northern Christian kingdoms, while those who stayed in Al-Andalus progressively arabised and became known as musta'arab (mozarabs). The slave population comprised the Ṣaqāliba (literally meaning "slavs", although they were slaves of generic European origin) as well as Sudanese slaves.

The Umayyad rulers faced a major Berber Revolt in the early 740s; the uprising originally broke out in North Africa (Tangier) and later spread across the peninsula. Following the Abbasid takeover from the Umayyads and the shift of the economic centre of the Islamic Caliphate from Damascus to Baghdad, the western province of al-Andalus was marginalised and ultimately became politically autonomous as independent emirate in 756, ruled by one of the last surviving Umayyad royals, Abd al-Rahman I.

Al-Andalus became a center of culture and learning, especially during the Caliphate of Córdoba. The Caliphate reached the height of its power under the rule of Abd-ar-Rahman III and his successor al-Hakam II, becoming then, in the view of Jaime Vicens Vives, "the most powerful state in Europe". Abd-ar-Rahman III also managed to expand the clout of Al-Andalus across the Strait of Gibraltar, waging war, as well as his successor, against the Fatimid Empire.

Between the 8th and 12th centuries, Al-Andalus enjoyed a notable urban vitality, both in terms of the growth of the preexisting cities as well as in terms of founding of new ones: Córdoba reached a population of 100,000 by the 10th century, Toledo 30,000 by the 11th century and Seville 80,000 by the 12th century.

During the Middle Ages, the North of the peninsula housed many small Christian polities including the Kingdom of Castile, the Kingdom of Aragon, the Kingdom of Navarre, the Kingdom of León or the Kingdom of Portugal, as well as a number of counties that spawned from the Carolingian Marca Hispanica. Christian and Muslim polities fought and allied among themselves in variable alliances. The Christian kingdoms progressively expanded south taking over Muslim territory in what is historiographically known as the "Reconquista" (the latter concept has been however noted as product of the claim to a pre-existing Spanish Catholic nation and it would not necessarily convey adequately "the complexity of centuries of warring and other more peaceable interactions between Muslim and Christian kingdoms in medieval Iberia between 711 and 1492").

The Caliphate of Córdoba was subsumed in a period of upheaval and civil war (the Fitna of al-Andalus) and collapsed in the early 11th century, spawning a series of ephemeral statelets, the taifas. Until the mid 11th century, most of the territorial expansion southwards of the Kingdom of Asturias/León was carried out through a policy of agricultural colonization rather than through military operations; then, profiting from the feebleness of the taifa principalities, Ferdinand I of León seized Lamego and Viseu (1057–1058) and Coimbra (1064) away from the Taifa of Badajoz (at times at war with the Taifa of Seville); Meanwhile, in the same year Coimbra was conquered, in the Northeastern part of the Iberian Peninsula, the Kingdom of Aragon took Barbastro from the Hudid Taifa of Lérida as part of an international expedition sanctioned by Pope Alexander II. Most critically, Alfonso VI of León-Castile conquered Toledo and its wider taifa in 1085, in what it was seen as a critical event at the time, entailing also a huge territorial expansion, advancing from the Sistema Central to La Mancha. In 1086, following the siege of Zaragoza by Alfonso VI of León-Castile, the Almoravids, religious zealots originally from the deserts of the Maghreb, landed in the Iberian Peninsula, and, having inflicted a serious defeat to Alfonso VI at the battle of Zalaca, began to seize control of the remaining taifas.

The Almoravids in the Iberian peninsula progressively relaxed strict observance of their faith, and treated both Jews and Mozarabs harshly, facing uprisings across the peninsula, initially in the Western part. The Almohads, another North-African Muslim sect of Masmuda Berber origin who had previously undermined the Almoravid rule south of the Strait of Gibraltar, first entered the peninsula in 1146.

Somewhat straying from the trend taking place in other locations of the Latin West since the 10th century, the period comprising the 11th and 13th centuries was not one of weakening monarchical power in the Christian kingdoms. The relatively novel concept of "frontier" (Sp: frontera), already reported in Aragon by the second half of the 11th century become widespread in the Christian Iberian kingdoms by the beginning of the 13th century, in relation to the more or less conflictual border with Muslim lands.

By the beginning of the 13th century, a power reorientation took place in the Iberian Peninsula (parallel to the Christian expansion in Southern Iberia and the increasing commercial impetus of Christian powers across the Mediterranean) and to a large extent, trade-wise, the Iberian Peninsula reorientated towards the North away from the Muslim World.

During the Middle Ages, the monarchs of Castile and León, from Alfonso V and Alfonso VI (crowned Hispaniae Imperator) to Alfonso X and Alfonso XI tended to embrace an imperial ideal based on a dual Christian and Jewish ideology.

Merchants from Genoa and Pisa were conducting an intense trading activity in Catalonia already by the 12th century, and later in Portugal. Since the 13th century, the Crown of Aragon expanded overseas; led by Catalans, it attained an overseas empire in the Western Mediterranean, with a presence in Mediterranean islands such as the Balearics, Sicily and Sardinia, and even conquering Naples in the mid-15th century. Genoese merchants invested heavily in the Iberian commercial enterprise with Lisbon becoming, according to Virgínia Rau, the "great centre of Genoese trade" in the early 14th century. The Portuguese would later detach their trade to some extent from Genoese influence. The Nasrid Kingdom of Granada, neighbouring the Strait of Gibraltar and founded upon a vassalage relationship with the Crown of Castile, also insinuated itself into the European mercantile network, with its ports fostering intense trading relations with the Genoese as well, but also with the Catalans, and to a lesser extent, with the Venetians, the Florentines, and the Portuguese.

Between 1275 and 1340, Granada became involved in the "crisis of the Strait", and was caught in a complex geopolitical struggle ("a kaleidoscope of alliances") with multiple powers vying for dominance of the Western Mediterranean, complicated by the unstable relations of Muslim Granada with the Marinid Sultanate. The conflict reached a climax in the 1340 Battle of Río Salado, when, this time in alliance with Granada, the Marinid Sultan (and Caliph pretender) Abu al-Hasan Ali ibn Othman made the last Marinid attempt to set up a power base in the Iberian Peninsula. The lasting consequences of the resounding Muslim defeat to an alliance of Castile and Portugal with naval support from Aragon and Genoa ensured Christian supremacy over the Iberian Peninsula and the preeminence of Christian fleets in the Western Mediterranean.

The 1348–1350 bubonic plague devastated large parts of the Iberian Peninsula, leading to a sudden economic cessation. Many settlements in northern Castile and Catalonia were left forsaken. The plague marked the start of the hostility and downright violence towards religious minorities (particularly the Jews) as an additional consequence in the Iberian realms.

The 14th century was a period of great upheaval in the Iberian realms. After the death of Peter the Cruel of Castile (reigned 1350–69), the House of Trastámara succeeded to the throne in the person of Peter's half brother, Henry II (reigned 1369–79). In the kingdom of Aragón, following the death without heirs of John I (reigned 1387–96) and Martin I (reigned 1396–1410), a prince of the House of Trastámara, Ferdinand I (reigned 1412–16), succeeded to the Aragonese throne. The Hundred Years' War also spilled over into the Iberian peninsula, with Castile particularly taking a role in the conflict by providing key naval support to France that helped lead to that nation's eventual victory. After the accession of Henry III to the throne of Castile, the populace, exasperated by the preponderance of Jewish influence, perpetrated a massacre of Jews at Toledo. In 1391, mobs went from town to town throughout Castile and Aragon, killing an estimated 50,000 Jews, or even as many as 100,000, according to Jane Gerber. Women and children were sold as slaves to Muslims, and many synagogues were converted into churches. According to Hasdai Crescas, about 70 Jewish communities were destroyed.

During the 15th century, Portugal, which had ended its southwards territorial expansion across the Iberian Peninsula in 1249 with the conquest of the Algarve, initiated an overseas expansion in parallel to the rise of the House of Aviz, conquering Ceuta (1415) arriving at Porto Santo (1418), Madeira and the Azores, as well as establishing additional outposts along the North-African Atlantic coast. In addition, already in the Early Modern Period, between the completion of the Granada War in 1492 and the death of Ferdinand of Aragon in 1516, the Hispanic Monarchy would make strides in the imperial expansion along the Mediterranean coast of the Maghreb.
During the Late Middle Ages, the Jews acquired considerable power and influence in Castile and Aragon.

Throughout the late Middle Ages, the Crown of Aragon took part in the mediterranean slave trade, with Barcelona (already in the 14th century), Valencia (particularly in the 15th century) and, to a lesser extent, Palma de Mallorca (since the 13th century), becoming dynamic centres in this regard, involving chiefly eastern and Muslim peoples. Castile engaged later in this economic activity, rather by adhering to the incipient atlantic slave trade involving sub-saharan people thrusted by Portugal (Lisbon being the largest slave centre in Western Europe) since the mid 15th century, with Seville becoming another key hub for the slave trade. Following the advance in the conquest of the Nasrid kingdom of Granada, the seizure of Málaga entailed the addition of another notable slave centre for the Crown of Castile.

By the end of the 15th century (1490) the Iberian kingdoms (including here the Balearic Islands) had an estimated population of 6.525 million (Crown of Castile, 4.3 million; Portugal, 1.0 million; Principality of Catalonia, 0.3 million; Kingdom of Valencia, 0.255 million; Kingdom of Granada, 0.25 million; Kingdom of Aragon, 0.25 million; Kingdom of Navarre, 0.12 million and the Kingdom of Mallorca, 0.05 million).

For three decades in the 15th century, the Hermandad de las Marismas, the trading association formed by the ports of Castile along the Cantabrian coast, resembling in some ways the Hanseatic League, fought against the latter, an ally of England, a rival of Castile in political and economic terms. Castile sought to claim the Gulf of Biscay as its own. In 1419, the powerful Castilian navy thoroughly defeated a Hanseatic fleet in La Rochelle.

In the late 15th century, the imperial ambition of the Iberian powers was pushed to new heights by the Catholic Monarchs in Castile and Aragon, and by Manuel I in Portugal.

The last Muslim stronghold, Granada, was conquered by a combined Castilian and Aragonese force in 1492. As many as 100,000 Moors died or were enslaved in the military campaign, while 200,000 fled to North Africa. Muslims and Jews throughout the period were variously tolerated or shown intolerance in different Christian kingdoms. After the fall of Granada, all Muslims and Jews were ordered to convert to Christianity or face expulsion—as many as 200,000 Jews were expelled from Spain. Historian Henry Kamen estimates that some 25,000 Jews died en route from Spain. The Jews were also expelled from Sicily and Sardinia, which were under Aragonese rule, and an estimated 37,000 to 100,000 Jews left.

In 1497, King Manuel I of Portugal forced all Jews in his kingdom to convert or leave. That same year he expelled all Muslims that were not slaves, and in 1502 the Catholic Monarchs followed suit, imposing the choice of conversion to Christianity or exile and loss of property. Many Jews and Muslims fled to North Africa and the Ottoman Empire, while others publicly converted to Christianity and became known respectively as Marranos and Moriscos (after the old term Moors). However, many of these continued to practice their religion in secret. The Moriscos revolted several times and were ultimately forcibly expelled from Spain in the early 17th century. From 1609 to 1614, over 300,000 Moriscos were sent on ships to North Africa and other locations, and, of this figure, around 50,000 died resisting the expulsion, and 60,000 died on the journey.

The change of relative supremacy from Portugal to the Hispanic Monarchy in the late 15th century has been described as one of the few cases of avoidance of the Thucydides Trap.

Modern Iberia

Challenging the conventions about the advent of modernity, Immanuel Wallerstein pushed back the origins of the capitalist modernity to the Iberian expansion of the 15th century. During the 16th century Spain created a vast empire in the Americas, with a state monopoly in Seville becoming the center of the ensuing transatlantic trade, based on bullion. Iberian imperialism, starting by the Portuguese establishment of routes to Asia and the posterior transatlantic trade with the New World by Spaniards and Portuguese (along Dutch, English and French), precipitated the economic decline of the Italian Peninsula. The 16th century was one of population growth with increased pressure over resources; in the case of the Iberian Peninsula a part of the population moved to the Americas meanwhile Jews and Moriscos were banished, relocating to other places in the Mediterranean Basin. Most of the Moriscos remained in Spain after the Morisco revolt in Las Alpujarras during the mid-16th century, but roughly 300,000 of them were expelled from the country in 1609–1614, and emigrated en masse to North Africa.

In 1580, after the political crisis that followed the 1578 death of King Sebastian, Portugal became a dynastic composite entity of the Hapsburg Monarchy; thus, the whole peninsula was united politically during the period known as the Iberian Union (1580–1640). During the reign of Philip II of Spain (I of Portugal), the Councils of Portugal, Italy, Flanders and Burgundy were added to the group of counselling institutions of the Hispanic Monarchy, to which the Councils of Castile, Aragon, Indies, Chamber of Castile, Inquisition, Orders, and Crusade already belonged, defining the organization of the Royal court that underpinned the  through which the empire operated. During the Iberian union, the "first great wave" of the transatlantic slave trade happened, according to Enriqueta Vila Villar, as new markets opened because of the unification gave thrust to the slave trade.

By 1600, the percentage of urban population for Spain was roughly 11.4%, while for Portugal the urban population was estimated as 14.1%, which were both above the 7.6% European average of the time (edged only by the Low Countries and the Italian Peninsula). Some striking differences appeared among the different Iberian realms. Castile, extending across a 60% of the territory of the peninsula and having 80% of the population was a rather urbanised country, yet with a widespread distribution of cities. Meanwhile, the urban population in the Crown of Aragon was highly concentrated in a handful of cities: Zaragoza (Kingdom of Aragon), Barcelona (Principality of Catalonia), and, to a lesser extent in the Kingdom of Valencia, in Valencia, Alicante and Orihuela. The case of Portugal presented an hypertrophied capital, Lisbon (which greatly increased its population during the 16th century, from 56,000 to 60,000 inhabitants by 1527, to roughly 120,000 by the third quarter of the century) with its demographic dynamism stimulated by the Asian trade, followed at great distance by Porto and Évora (both roughly accounting for 12,500 inhabitants). Throughout most of the 16th century, both Lisbon and Seville were among the Western Europe's largest and most dynamic cities.

The 17th century has been largely considered as a very negative period for the Iberian economies, seen as a time of recession, crisis or even decline, the urban dynamism chiefly moving to Northern Europe. A dismantling of the inner city network in the Castilian plateau took place during this period (with a parallel accumulation of economic activity in the capital, Madrid), with only New Castile resisting recession in the interior. Regarding the Atlantic façade of Castile, aside from the severing of trade with Northern Europe, inter-regional trade with other regions in the Iberian Peninsula also suffered to some extent. In Aragon, suffering from similar problems than Castile, the expelling of the Moriscos in 1609 in the Kingdom of Valencia aggravated the recession. Silk turned from a domestic industry into a raw commodity to be exported. However, the crisis was uneven (affecting longer the centre of the peninsula), as both Portugal and the Mediterranean coastline recovered in the later part of the century by fuelling a sustained growth.

The aftermath of the intermittent 1640–1668 Portuguese Restoration War brought the House of Braganza as the new ruling dynasty in the Portuguese territories across the world (bar Ceuta), putting an end to the Iberian Union.

Despite both Portugal and Spain starting their path towards modernization with the liberal revolutions of the first half of the 19th century, this process was, concerning structural changes in the geographical distribution of the population, relatively tame compared to what took place after World War II in the Iberian Peninsula, when strong urban development ran in parallel to substantial rural flight patterns.

Geography and geology

The Iberian Peninsula is the westernmost of the three major southern European peninsulas—the Iberian, Italian, and Balkan. It is bordered on the southeast and east by the Mediterranean Sea, and on the north, west, and southwest by the Atlantic Ocean. The Pyrenees mountains are situated along the northeast edge of the peninsula, where it adjoins the rest of Europe. Its southern tip, located in Tarifa is the southernmost point of the European continent and is very close to the northwest coast of Africa, separated from it by the Strait of Gibraltar and the Mediterranean Sea.

The Iberian Peninsula encompasses 583,254 km2 and has very contrasting and uneven relief. The mountain ranges of the Iberian Peninsula are mainly distributed from west to east, and in some cases reach altitudes of approximately 3000 mamsl, resulting in the region having the second highest mean altitude (637 mamsl) in Western Europe.

The irregular, roughly octagonal shape of the peninsula contained within this spherical quadrangle was compared to an ox-hide by the geographer Strabo.

About three quarters of that rough octagon is the Meseta Central, a vast plateau ranging from 610 to 760 m in altitude. It is located approximately in the centre, staggered slightly to the east and tilted slightly toward the west (the conventional centre of the Iberian Peninsula has long been considered Getafe just south of Madrid). It is ringed by mountains and contains the sources of most of the rivers, which find their way through gaps in the mountain barriers on all sides.

Coastline
The coast has been inundated over time, with sea levels having risen from a minimum of  lower than today at the Last Glacial Maximum (LGM) to its current level at 4,000 years BP. The coastal shelf created by sedimentation during that time remains below the surface; however, it was never very extensive on the Atlantic side, as the continental shelf drops rather steeply into the depths.

The submarine topography of the coastal waters of the Iberian Peninsula has been studied extensively in the process of drilling for oil. In the north, between the continental shelf and the abyss, is an extension called the Galicia Bank, a plateau that also contains the Porto, Vigo, and Vasco da Gama seamounts, which form the Galicia interior basin. The southern border of these features is marked by Nazaré Canyon, which splits the continental shelf and leads directly into the abyss.

Rivers

The major rivers flow through the wide valleys between the mountain systems. These are the Ebro, Douro, Tagus, Guadiana and Guadalquivir. All rivers in the Iberian Peninsula are subject to seasonal variations in flow.

The Tagus is the longest river on the peninsula and, like the Douro, flows westwards with its lower course in Portugal. The Guadiana river bends southwards and forms the border between Spain and Portugal in the last stretch of its course.

Mountains
The terrain of the Iberian Peninsula is largely mountainous. The major mountain systems are:
 The Pyrenees and their foothills, the Pre-Pyrenees, crossing the isthmus of the peninsula so completely as to allow no passage except by mountain road, trail, coastal road or tunnel. Aneto in the Maladeta massif, at 3,404 m, is the highest point

 The Cantabrian Mountains along the northern coast with the massive Picos de Europa. Torre de Cerredo, at 2,648 m, is the highest point
 The Galicia/Trás-os-Montes Massif in the Northwest is made up of very old heavily eroded rocks. Pena Trevinca, at 2,127 m, is the highest point
 The Sistema Ibérico, a complex system at the heart of the peninsula, in its central/eastern region. It contains a great number of ranges and divides the watershed of the Tagus, Douro and Ebro rivers. Moncayo, at 2,313 m, is the highest point
 The Sistema Central, dividing the Iberian Plateau into a northern and a southern half and stretching into Portugal (where the highest point of Continental Portugal (1,993 m) is located in the Serra da Estrela). Pico Almanzor in the Sierra de Gredos is the highest point, at 2,592 m
 The Montes de Toledo, which also stretches into Portugal from the La Mancha natural region at the eastern end. Its highest point, at 1,603 m, is La Villuerca in the Sierra de Villuercas, Extremadura
 The Sierra Morena, which divides the watershed of the Guadiana and Guadalquivir rivers. At 1,332 m, Bañuela is the highest point
 The Baetic System, which stretches between Cádiz and Gibraltar and northeast towards Alicante Province. It is divided into three subsystems:
 Prebaetic System, which begins west of the Sierra Sur de Jaén, reaching the Mediterranean Sea shores in Alicante Province. La Sagra is the highest point at 2,382 m.
 Subbaetic System, which is in a central position within the Baetic Systems, stretching from Cape Trafalgar in Cádiz Province across Andalusia to the Region of Murcia.
 Penibaetic System, located in the far southeastern area stretching between Gibraltar across the Mediterranean coastal Andalusian provinces. It includes the highest point in the peninsula, the 3,478 m high Mulhacén in the Sierra Nevada.

Geology

The Iberian Peninsula contains rocks of every geological period from the Ediacaran to the Recent, and almost every kind of rock is represented. World-class mineral deposits can also be found there. The core of the Iberian Peninsula consists of a Hercynian cratonic block known as the Iberian Massif. On the northeast, this is bounded by the Pyrenean fold belt, and on the southeast it is bounded by the Baetic System. These twofold chains are part of the Alpine belt. To the west, the peninsula is delimited by the continental boundary formed by the magma-poor opening of the Atlantic Ocean. The Hercynian Foldbelt is mostly buried by Mesozoic and Tertiary cover rocks to the east, but nevertheless outcrops through the Sistema Ibérico and the Catalan Mediterranean System.

Also in the Iberian Massif, and similarly to other Hercynian blocks in Europe, the peninsula hosts some uranium deposits, largely located in the Central Iberian Zone unit.

The Iberian Pyrite Belt, located in the SW quadrant of the Peninsula, ranks among the most important volcanogenic massive sulphide districts on Earth, and it has been exploited for millennia.

Climate

The Iberian Peninsula's location and topography, as well as the effects of large atmospheric circulation patterns induce a NW to SE gradient of yearly precipitation (roughly from 2,000 mm to 300 mm).

The Iberian peninsula has three dominant climate types. One of these is the oceanic climate seen in the northeast in which precipitation has barely any difference between winter and summer. Peniche vs Santarém) There are also more localized semi-arid climates in central Spain, with temperatures resembling a more continental Mediterranean climate. In other extreme cases highland alpine climates such as in Sierra Nevada and areas with extremely low precipitation and desert climates or semi-arid climates such as the Almería area, Murcia area and southern Alicante area. In sharp contrast A Coruña at the northern tip of Galicia has a summer daytime high average at just below . This cool and wet summer climate is replicated throughout most of the northern coastline. Winters in the Peninsula are for the most part, mild, although frosts are common in higher altitude areas of central Spain. The warmest winter nights are usually found in downwelling favourable areas of the west coast, such as on capes. Precipitation varies greatly between regions on the Peninsula, in December for example the northern west coast averages above  whereas the southeast can average below . Insolation can vary from just 1,600 hours in the Bilbao area, to above 3,000 hours in the Algarve and Gulf of Cádiz.

Major modern countries

The current political configuration of the Iberian Peninsula comprises the bulk of Portugal and Spain, the whole microstate of Andorra, a small part of the French department of Pyrénées-Orientales (French Cerdagne), and the British Overseas Territory of Gibraltar.

French Cerdagne is on the south side of the Pyrenees mountain range, which runs along the border between Spain and France. For example, the Segre river, which runs west and then south to meet the Ebro, has its source on the French side. The Pyrenees range is often considered the northeastern boundary of Iberian Peninsula, although the French coastline curves away from the rest of Europe north of the range, which is the reason why Perpignan, which is also known as the capital of Northern Catalonia,  is often considered as the entrance to the Iberian Peninsula.

Regarding Portugal and Spain, this chiefly excludes the Macaronesian archipelagos (the Azores and Madeira of Portugal, and the Canary Islands of Spain), the Balearic Islands (Spain), and the Spanish overseas territories in North Africa (most conspicuously the cities of Ceuta and Melilla, as well as unpopulated islets and rocks).

Political divisions of the Iberian Peninsula:

Cities 

The Iberian city network is dominated by three international metropolises (Barcelona, Lisbon, and Madrid) and four regional metropolises (Bilbao, Porto, Seville, and Valencia). The relatively weak integration of the network favours a competitive approach vis-à-vis the inter-relation between the different centres. Among these metropolises, Madrid stands out within the global urban hierarchy in terms of its status as a major service centre and enjoys the greatest degree of connectivity.

Major metropolitan regions
According to Eurostat (2019), the metropolitan regions with a population over one million are listed as follows:

Ecology

Forests

The woodlands of the Iberian Peninsula are distinct ecosystems. Although the various regions are each characterized by distinct vegetation, there are some similarities across the peninsula.

While the borders between these regions are not clearly defined, there is a mutual influence that makes it very hard to establish boundaries and some species find their optimal habitat in the intermediate areas.

The endangered Iberian lynx (Lynx pardinus) is a symbol of the Iberian mediterranean forest and of the fauna of the Iberian Peninsula altogether.

A new Podarcis lizard species, Podarcis virescens, was accepted as a species by the Taxonomic Committee of the Societas Europaea Herpetologica in 2020. This lizard is native to the Iberian Peninsula and found near rivers in the region.

East Atlantic flyway
The Iberian Peninsula is an important stopover on the East Atlantic flyway for birds migrating from northern Europe to Africa. For example, curlew sandpipers rest in the region of the Bay of Cádiz.

In addition to the birds migrating through, some seven million wading birds from the north spend the winter in the estuaries and wetlands of the Iberian Peninsula, mainly at locations on the Atlantic coast. In Galicia are Ría de Arousa (a home of grey plover), Ria de Ortigueira, Ria de Corme and Ria de Laxe. In Portugal, the Aveiro Lagoon hosts Recurvirostra avosetta, the common ringed plover, grey plover and little stint. Ribatejo Province on the Tagus supports Recurvirostra arosetta, grey plover, dunlin, bar-tailed godwit and common redshank. In the Sado Estuary are dunlin, Eurasian curlew, grey plover and common redshank. The Algarve hosts red knot, common greenshank and turnstone. The Guadalquivir Marshes region of Andalusia and the Salinas de Cádiz are especially rich in wintering wading birds: Kentish plover, common ringed plover, sanderling, and black-tailed godwit in addition to the others. And finally, the Ebro delta is home to all the species mentioned above.

Languages

With the sole exception of Basque, which is of unknown origin, all modern Iberian languages descend from Vulgar Latin and belong to the Western Romance languages. Throughout history (and pre-history), many different languages have been spoken in the Iberian Peninsula, contributing to the formation and differentiation of the contemporaneous languages of Iberia; however, most of them have become extinct or fallen into disuse. Basque is the only non-Indo-European surviving language in Iberia and Western Europe.

In modern times, Spanish (the official language of Spain, spoken by the entire 45 million population in the country, the native language of about 36 million in Europe), Portuguese (the official language of Portugal, with a population over 10 million), Catalan (over 7 million speakers in Europe, 3.4 million with Catalan as first language), Galician (understood by the 93% of the 2.8 million Galician population) and Basque (cf. around 1 million speakers) are the most widely spoken languages in the Iberian Peninsula. Spanish and Portuguese have expanded beyond Iberia to the rest of world, becoming global languages.

Other minority romance languages with some degree of recognition include the several varieties of Astur-leonese, collectively amounting to about 0.6 million speakers, and the Aragonese (barely spoken by the 8% of the 130,000 people inhabiting the Alto Aragón). 

English is the official language of Gibraltar. Llanito is a unique language in the territory, an amalgamation of mostly English and Spanish. In Spain, only 54.3% could speak a foreign language, below that of the EU-28 average. Portugal meanwhile achieved 69%, above the EU average, but still below the EU median. Spain ranks 25th out of 33 European countries in the English Proficiency Index.

Transportation 
Both Spain and Portugal have traditionally used a non-standard rail gauge (the 1,668 mm Iberian gauge) since the construction of the first railroads in the 19th century. Spain has progressively introduced the 1,435 mm standard gauge in its new high-speed rail network (one of the most extensive in the world), inaugurated in 1992 with the Madrid–Seville line, followed to name a few by the Madrid–Barcelona (2008), Madrid–Valencia (2010), an Alicante branch of the latter (2013) and the connection to France of the Barcelona line. Portugal however suspended all the high-speed rail projects in the wake of the 2008 financial crisis, putting an end for the time being to the possibility of a high-speed rail connection between Lisbon, Porto and Madrid.

Handicapped by a mountainous range (the Pyrenees) hindering the connection to the rest of Europe, Spain (and subsidiarily Portugal) only has two meaningful rail connections to France able for freight transport, located at both ends of the mountain range. An international rail line across the Central Pyrenees linking Zaragoza and the French city of Pau through a tunnel existed in the past; however, an accident in the French part destroyed a stretch of the railroad in 1970 and the Canfranc Station has been a cul-de-sac since then.

There are four points connecting the Portuguese and Spanish rail networks: Valença do Minho–Tui, Vilar Formoso–Fuentes de Oñoro, Marvão-Beirã–Valencia de Alcántara and Elvas–Badajoz.

The prospect of the development (as part of a European-wide effort) of the Central, Mediterranean and Atlantic rail corridors is expected to be a way to improve the competitiveness of the ports of Tarragona, Valencia, Sagunto, Bilbao, Santander, Sines and Algeciras vis-à-vis the rest of Europe and the World.

Years of studies have, however, made no real progress thus far.

A transit point for many submarine cables, the Fibre-optic Link Around the Globe, Europe India Gateway, and the SEA-ME-WE 3 feature landing stations in the Iberian Peninsula. The West Africa Cable System, Main One, SAT-3/WASC, Africa Coast to Europe also land in Portugal. MAREA, a high capacity communication transatlantic cable, connects the north of the Iberian Peninsula (Bilbao) to North America (Virginia), whereas Grace Hopper is an upcoming cable connecting the Iberian Peninsula (Bilbao) to the UK and the US intended to be operative by 2022 and EllaLink is an upcoming high-capacity communication cable expected to connect the Peninsula (Sines) to South America and the mammoth 2Africa project intends to connect the peninsula to the United Kingdom, Europe and Africa (via Portugal and Barcelona) by 2023–24.

Two gas pipelines: the Pedro Duran Farell pipeline and (more recently) the Medgaz (from, respectively, Morocco and Algeria) link the Maghreb and the Iberian Peninsula, providing Spain with Algerian natural gas. However the contract for the first pipeline expires on 31 October 2021 and—amidst  a tense climate of Algerian–Moroccan relations—there are no plans to renew it.

Economy 
The official currency across Iberia is the Euro, with the exception of Gibraltar, which uses the Gibraltar Pound (at parity with Sterling).

Major industries include mining, tourism, small farms, and fishing. Because the coast is so long, fishing is popular, especially sardines, tuna and anchovies. Most of the mining occurs in the Pyrenees mountains. Commodities mined include: iron, gold, coal, lead, silver, zinc, and salt.

Regarding their role in the global economy, both the microstate of Andorra and the British Overseas Territory of Gibraltar have been described as tax havens.

The Galician region of Spain, in the north-west of the Iberian Peninsula, became one of the biggest entry points of cocaine in Europe, on a par with the Dutch ports. Hashish is smuggled from Morocco via the Strait of Gibraltar.

See also
 Iberian Federalism
 Macaronesia

Notes

References

Citations

Bibliography

External links

 
 
 
 

 
Peninsulas of Europe
Geography of Southwestern Europe
Regions of Europe
Regions of Eurasia
Geography of Portugal
Geography of Spain
Geography of France
Geography of Andorra
Geography of Gibraltar
Historic Jewish communities
Peninsulas of Portugal
Peninsulas of Spain
Peninsulas of France
Southwestern Europe